Centerville is an unincorporated community in Calhoun County, Illinois, United States. Centerville is southeast of Brussels.

References

Unincorporated communities in Calhoun County, Illinois
Unincorporated communities in Illinois